Ryan Wolfe (born November 23, 1986) is a former American football wide receiver. He played college football at UNLV.  Was an All-State performer at Hart High School in Newhall, CA.

College career
Wolfe attended UNLV from 2005 to 2009. He recorded 283 receptions for 3,495 yards and 15 touchdowns.

Professional career
Wolfe was signed as an undrafted free agent by the Atlanta Falcons on April 24, 2010.

External links
UNLV Rebels bio

References

1986 births
Living people
Sportspeople from Santa Clarita, California
American football wide receivers
UNLV Rebels football players
Atlanta Falcons players